Milan Brych (born 11 December 1939) is a Czech-born cancer therapist. He was removed from the New Zealand Medical Register in 1977 and in 1980 he was convicted of practising medicine without a licence in California.

Brych fled the Soviet invasion of Czechoslovakia in 1968, and arrived in New Zealand as a refugee. Claiming to have medical professional qualifications, Brych commenced work as a medical practitioner.  After being removed from the register of NZ medical practitioners in 1977, he then relocated his cancer treatment practice to the Cook Islands.  One of his most high profile proponents in the 1970s was the then Premier of Queensland Joh Bjelke-Petersen, who invited him to set up practice in Australia. Brych relocated to the USA, and in 1980 was convicted of practising medicine without a license. After serving part of his six-year sentence, he was deported.

History
Milan Brych (pronounced "brick") was born Vlastimil Brych on 11 December 1939 in Czechoslovakia.
After the 1968 Soviet invasion of Czechoslovakia, he fled to Italy, then as a refugee arrived in New Zealand. Brych claimed to have studied Medicine at the University of Brno.  It was later revealed that at the time he claimed to have been studying, he was in fact in prison.

New Zealand

After being accepted as a refugee, he obtained a position in radiotherapy at the Auckland General Hospital. In 1973 the faculty initiated questioning of his qualifications and his claimed "miraculous success" in cancer treatment.  Brych was removed from the New Zealand Medical Register in 1974.

The Cook Islands

Brych left New Zealand after his appeal against his disbarment failed and moved his practice to Rarotonga in the Cook Islands in March 1977. His practice was supported by the Cook Islands' Health Minister Joe Williams, who arranged for medical supplies to be sent to him. In May 1977 one of his patients died while returning to New Zealand. In the leadup to the 1978 Cook Islands general election then-opposition leader Dr Tom Davis pledged that if elected he would not allow Brych to continue to practice. When Davis was elected Prime Minister he immediately barred Brych from Rarotonga hospital. His patients were sent home and he was ordered not to return to the islands.

A small cemetery, adjacent to the RSA (Returned Servicemen's Association) Cemetery in Rarotonga is reported as being nicknamed "the Brych-yard", as it contains the graves of many of Brych's patients.

Queensland, Australia

In 1978, then Premier of Queensland Joh Bjelke-Petersen asked Brych to set up practice in Queensland. In the time of his premiership, Bjelke-Petersen's wishes were usually implemented. Then Deputy Premier Dr Llew Edwards, a general practitioner, strenuously opposed and ultimately defeated in Cabinet Bjelke-Petersen's invitation.

Convictions and disappearance
Brych relocated his practice to Los Angeles. In September 1980 he was arrested for conspiracy, fraud, and practising medicine without a licence. He was released after no charges were laid, but re-arrested in December. In June 1983 he was found guilty of 12 counts of malpractice and grand theft and in July 1983 he was sentenced to six years imprisonment. After serving three years of his sentence he was deported to New Zealand and then disappeared from popular and media attention.

According to a Television New Zealand documentary aired on 26 August 2012 he was living in London. In 2015, The Cook Island News claimed he was living in Switzerland under a different name.

See also
 Tom Neale
 Ernst T. Krebs

References

External links 
 Milan Brych the Cancer Man

1939 births
Living people
New Zealand radiologists
New Zealand people of Czech descent
Czech emigrants to the Cook Islands
Czechoslovak refugees
People deported from the United States
Masaryk University
Czech fraudsters